Moonnam Pralayam is a 2019 Indian Malayalam-language drama film directed by Ratheesh Raju M.R and written by S.K. Vilwan based on Kerala floods and its after effects. The film was produced by Devasia Kuriakose under the banner of Niagara Movies. It stars Ashkkar Soudaan, Sai Kumar, Bindu Panikkar, Kulappulli Leela, V. Suresh Thampanoor and Anil Murali.

The story of the film follows the happenings at a relief camp opened in a church at Kainakary in Kuttanad. It was filmed in 18 days. The film was theatrically released on 2 August 2019.

Cast
 Sai Kumar
 Ashkkar Soudaan
 Bindu Panikkar
 Kulappulli Leela
 V. Suresh Thampanoor
 Anil Murali
 Sanuja Somanath
 Sandra Nair
 Aneesh Anand
 Basil Mathew

Release
The official trailer of the film was unveiled by Millennium Audios on 19 July 2019.

The film was theatrically released on 2 August 2019.

Soundtrack 

The soundtrack is composed by Raghupathy and Manithamara and lyrics are by Manithamara. Sachithandan Puzhankara

References

External links
 

2019 films
Indian drama films
Indian films based on actual events
2010s Malayalam-language films